Liucheng can refer to many places in China:

 Liucheng County (柳城县), Guangxi Zhuang Autonomous Region
 Liucheng, Xinjiang (柳城), Xinjiang Province, which was also known as Lukchak
 Chaoyang, Liaoning (朝阳市), Liaoning Province, which was called Liucheng (柳城) in the Three Kingdoms period of Chinese history
 Liuchengzhen (柳城镇), Dongyuan County, Guangdong Province